Annai Teresa College Of Engineering is a College of Engineering that is located in Thirunavalur, Villupuram. It's an Engineering College.

External links

Engineering colleges in Tamil Nadu
Education in Viluppuram district